Marasmius valdivianus is a species of fungus in the large agaric genus Marasmius. Found in Chile, the fungus was described as new to science in 1969 by mycologist Rolf Singer.

See also
List of Marasmius species

References

External links

valdivianus
Fungi described in 1969
Fungi of Chile
Taxa named by Rolf Singer